James A. "Jim" Gibbs (January 17, 1922 – April 30, 2010) was a United States author, lighthouse keeper, and maritime historian.

He was one of the lighthouse keepers at Tillamook Rock Light for a year beginning in 1945. In 1948 Gibbs was one of the five founders of the Puget Sound Maritime Historical Society.
He was the editor of Marine Digest magazine until 1972.

He built and lived in Cleft of the Rock Light near Yachats, Oregon, "the first privately owned working lighthouse in Oregon" until his death on April 30, 2010.

Works 
 
 
 
 
 
 
 
 
 
 
 
 
James A. Gibbs, Jr. (1953). Tillamook Light.

References 

Writers from Oregon
People from Lincoln County, Oregon
American maritime historians
1922 births
2010 deaths
American lighthouse keepers
20th-century American historians
American male non-fiction writers
20th-century American male writers
21st-century American historians
21st-century American male writers
Historians from Washington (state)
Writers from Seattle